Halima Chehaima is a Belgian beauty queen who won the title of Miss Brussels 2007.  She also won the Miss International Tourism contest in 2007 in Portugal and represented Belgium in Miss World 2007 in China. 

In November 2006 the pageant's steering committee came to Chehaima's defense after it was suggested she had dangerous acquaintances.

Personal life
She was born to a Moroccan father and a Belgian (Flemish) mother.

Further reading

References

Miss World 2007 delegates
1988 births
Belgian people of Moroccan descent
Belgian beauty pageant winners
Models from Brussels
Living people